"Top of the Pops" is a song by the American alternative rock group The Smithereens. It is the first single released in support of their fourth album Blow Up.

Formats and track listing 
All songs written by Pat DiNizio, except where noted.
European 7" single (204 558 7)
"Top of the Pops" – 4:32
"Poor Little Pitiful One" – 3:33

European CD single (CDP 650)
"Top of the Pops" – 4:32
"Poor Little Pitiful One" – 3:33
"One After 909" (Lennon–McCartney) – 3:36
"Shakin' All Over" (Johnny Kidd, Gus Robinson) – 4:06
"A Girl Like You (MTV Unplugged)" – 4:44

US cassette single (4 km-44762)
"Top of the Pops" – 4:32
"Poor Little Pitiful One" – 3:33
"Anywhere You Are (instrumental version)" – 3:44

Charts

References

External links 
 

1991 songs
1991 singles
Capitol Records singles
The Smithereens songs
Song recordings produced by Ed Stasium
Songs written by Pat DiNizio